Fushanosaurus (meaning "Fushan lizard", after the Fushan Museum where its remains are stored) is a genus of sauropod dinosaur from the Shishugou Formation from Xinjiang Province in China. The type and only species is Fushanosaurus qitaiensis.  It is solely known from the holotype specimen FH000101, a complete right femur.

Fushanosaurus was originally described as a titanosauriform, but the features initially believed to indicate titanosauriform affinities are actually more widespread among sauropods, and Fushanosaurus may be a mamenchisaurid, the only group of sauropods definitely known to be present in the Shishugou Formation.

References 

Macronarians
Callovian life
Oxfordian life
Middle Jurassic dinosaurs of Asia
Late Jurassic dinosaurs of Asia
Jurassic China
Fossil taxa described in 2019